The Women's heptathlon competition at the 2012 Summer Olympics in London, United Kingdom. The event was held at the Olympic Stadium on 3–4 August.

The gold medal was won by Jessica Ennis.
She bettered Eunice Barber's World Heptathlon Best in the 100 metres hurdles by .08 of a second. Many others in the field also achieved their personal bests in the same event.

2004 silver medalist Austra Skujytė outperformed Ennis by 6 cm in the high jump, clearing 1.92m, and in the shot put, where both athletes scored personal bests.

In the 200 metres, Ennis regained the lead, tying with Dafne Schippers at 22.83 seconds, a personal best for both. Ennis ended this first day with a lead of 175 points.

On the second day, Ennis initially struggled with the long jump, but figured out her marks eventually posting a respectable 6.48m. Reigning World Champion Tatyana Chernova had the best mark in the event with 6.54m. Sofia Ifadidou came first in the javelin, setting a new Olympic best of 56.96m while Ennis was over 7 metres behind. Ennis went into the 800 metres with almost a 200-point lead over the slower Skujytė. Confident of a win, she led the race, doing the first 400 in 61.89sec. She paid for that fast pace, being overtaken by Lilli Schwarzkopf and Chernova who were battling over the silver medal. But on the home stretch, Ennis again showed her superiority, passing them both to win in 2:08.65. Chernova won the battle but could not make up the 35 point differential, so Schwarzkopf took silver and Chernova the bronze. Initially after the 800 metres, Schwarzkopf was disqualified for breaking lane, but this later turned out to be a mistake, Kristina Savitskaya in the neighbouring lane having done so, and Schwarzkopf was re-instated.

Ennis's final score was 6955 points, a British and Commonwealth record.

In 2013, Chernova was suspended over doping violations back to 2009.  Subsequently, the IAAF filed a case with the Court of Arbitration questioning the selective suspension periods of her and five other Russian athletes that made them eligible between 2011 and 2013.

Competition format
The heptathlon consists of seven track and field events, with a points system that awards higher scores for better results in each of the seven events. The seven event scores are summed to give a total for the heptathlon.

Records
, the existing World and Olympic records were as follows.

Schedule
All times are British Summer Time (UTC+1)

Detailed results

100 metres hurdles
Wind: +0.7, −0.2, +2.0, +0.9, +1.3 m/s.

High jump

Shot put

200 metres
Wind: +0.8, +0.9, +0.3, +0.6, -0.3 m/s.

Long jump

Javelin throw

800 metres

Overall results 

The final results of the event are in the following table.

Key

References

Heptathlon
2012
2012 in women's athletics
Women's events at the 2012 Summer Olympics